Riedelomyia is a genus of crane fly in the family Limoniidae.

Distribution
India, Fiji & Papua New Guinea.

Species
R. chionopus Alexander, 1949
R. gratiosa Alexander, 1928
R. lipoleuca Alexander, 1969
R. niveiapicalis (Brunetti, 1918)
R. papuensis Alexander, 1941
R. teucholabina (Alexander, 1921)

References

Limoniidae
Diptera of Australasia
Diptera of Asia